Charlotte High School is a public high school located in Charlotte, Texas (USA) and classified as a 2A school by the UIL. It is part of the Charlotte Independent School District located in central Atascosa County. In 2015, the school was rated "Met Standard" by the Texas Education Agency.

Athletics
The Charlotte Trojans compete in these sports 

Baseball
Basketball
Cross Country
Football
Golf
Powerlifting
Softball
Track and Field
Volleyball

References

External links
 

Schools in Atascosa County, Texas
Public high schools in Texas